S. M. Sirajul Islam Suruj is a Bangladesh Awami League politician and the former Member of Parliament of Bogra-6.

Career
Suruj was elected to parliament from Bogra-6 as a Bangladesh Awami League candidate in 1973. Following the 15 August 1975 Bangladesh coup d'état he was arrested. He was sentenced to four years imprisonment by a military court on 3 August 1975.

References

Awami League politicians
Living people
1st Jatiya Sangsad members
Year of birth missing (living people)